This is a summary of the year 2015 in the Canadian music industry.

Events
March 10 – Rapper Shad is announced as the new host of CBC Radio One's daily arts and culture magazine show Q
March 15 – Juno Awards of 2015
March 29 – Chad VanGaalen wins the Prism Prize for his music video for Timber Timbre's song "Beat the Drum Slowly".
April – East Coast Music Awards
April 12 – Kevin Bazinet wins the third season of La Voix.
June 16 – Prelimimary longlist for the 2015 Polaris Music Prize is announced.
July 9 – Dear Rouge (English) and Antoine Corriveau (French) are announced as the winners of the 2015 SOCAN Songwriting Prize.
July 16 – Shortlist for the Polaris Music Prize is announced.
September 21 – Buffy Sainte-Marie wins the Polaris Music Prize for her album Power in the Blood.
November 8 – 11th Canadian Folk Music Awards

Bands formed
Saint Asonia

Albums released

#
2Frères, Nous autres

A
The Acorn, Vieux Loup – May 19
Bryan Adams, Get Up! – October 16
Bernard Adamus, Sorel Soviet So What
a l l i e, Moonlust
Marie-Pierre Arthur, Si l'aurore – February
Astral Swans, All My Favorite Singers Are Willie Nelson

B
BADBADNOTGOOD with Ghostface Killah, Sour Soul – February 17
Barenaked Ladies, Silverball – June 2
Justin Bieber, Purpose
The Blue Stones, Black Holes - October 20
Philippe Brach, Portraits de famine
Braids, Deep in the Iris – April 28
Dean Brody, Gypsy Road – April 21
Burnstick, Dream Big, Little One / Fais de beaux rêves, petit ange
Spencer Burton, Some That Were, Some That Are and Some That Will Be

C
Kathryn Calder, Kathryn Calder
Cancer Bats, Searching for Zero – March 10
Cannon Bros., Dream City
Alessia Cara, Four Pink Walls – August 28
Casper Skulls, Lips & Skull
Chic Gamine, Light a Match
Annabelle Chvostek, Be the Media – April 30
Cindy Lee, Act of Tenderness
Cindy Lee, Malenkost
City and Colour, If I Should Go Before You – October 9
Tom Cochrane, Take It Home – February 10
Cœur de pirate, Roses – August 28
Concealer, feted:fetid
Louis-Jean Cormier, Les Grandes artères – March 23
Corridor, Le Voyage Éternel

D
Danko Jones, Fire Music – February 6
Thomas D'Arcy, Fooled You Twice
Dear Rouge, Black to Gold
The Dears, Times Infinity Volume One – September 25
Mac DeMarco, Demos Volume One – January 20
Destroyer, Poison Season – August 28
Devours, Avalon
Digawolf, Great Northern Man
Dilly Dally, Sore
Alan Doyle, So Let's Go
Drake, If You're Reading This It's Too Late – February 14

E
Eccodek, Remixing in Tongues
The Elwins, Play for Keeps – February 24
Exco Levi, Country Man – March 17

F
Michael Feuerstack, The Forgettable Truth – February 17
Flying Hórses, Tölt
Foxtrott, A Taller Us
Jeanick Fournier, Mes coups de cœur
Fresh Snow, WON
Lily Frost, Too Hot for Words

G
Galaxie, Zulu – February 24
Godspeed You! Black Emperor, Asunder, Sweet and Other Distress – March 31
The Golden Dogs, 3 1/2 – February 17
Grand Analog, Roll Dub Soul Rap – October 8
Great Lake Swimmers, A Forest of Arms – April 21
Grimes, Art Angels

H
Half Moon Run, Sun Leads Me On – October 23
Ron Hawkins and the Do Good Assassins, Garden Songs – February 3 
Hayden, Hey Love – March 24
Hedley, Hello
Hello, Blue Roses, WZO – February
The High Dials, In the AM Wilds – February 3
Hilotrons, To Trip with Terpsichore
Hollerado, 111 Songs – March 24
Andrew Hyatt, Never Back Down

J
Tobias Jesso Jr., Goon – March 17
Carly Rae Jepsen, E•MO•TION – August 21
Lyndon John X, Escape from the Mongoose Gang

K
k-os, Can't Fly Without Gravity – September 4
Andy Kim, It's Decided – February 24
The King Khan & BBQ Show, Bad News Boys
Brett Kissel, Pick Me Up – September 11
Koriass, Petit love
Diana Krall, Wallflower – February 2
Nicholas Krgovich, On Cahuenga

L
Jean Leloup, À Paradis City
Library Voices, Lovish
Limblifter, Pacific Milk – April 7

M
Majical Cloudz, Are You Alone?
 Catherine Major, La maison du monde
Dan Mangan + Blacksmith, Club Meds – January 13
 Cory Marks, This Man – May 26
Kalle Mattson, Avalanche
Michelle McAdorey, Into Her Future – October 30
Linda McRae, Shadow Trails
Shawn Mendes, Handwritten
Metric, Pagans in Vegas – September 18
METZ, METZ II
Ariane Moffatt, 22h22
Moka Only, Voice of the Misfits – December 31
The Most Serene Republic, Mediac – November 13

N
Laura Niquay, Waratanak
Safia Nolin, Limoilou

O
Lindi Ortega, Faded Gloryville – August 7

P
Dorothea Paas, Calm Your Body Down
Philémon Cimon, Les femmes comme des montagnes
Joel Plaskett, The Park Avenue Sobriety Test – March 3
Purity Ring, Another Eternity – March 3

R
Rah Rah, Vessels – March
Lee Reed, The Butcher, the Banker, the Bitumen Tanker
Sam Roberts Band, Counting the Days – April 18

S
Buffy Sainte-Marie, Power in the Blood – May 12
Natasha St-Pier, Mon Acadie – October 2
Samantha Savage Smith, Fine Lines – January 27
Ivana Santilli, Late Night Light – March 10
Saint Asonia, Saint Asonia (album) – June 31
Sarahmée, Légitime
Lorraine Segato, Invincible Decency
Ron Sexsmith, Carousel One – March 31
Siskiyou, Nervous – January 20
Zal Sissokho, Marcus Viana and Ibrahima Gaye, Famalé
Slim Twig, Thank You for Sticking with Twig – August 7
Les Sœurs Boulay, 4488 de l'amour

T
Three Days Grace, Human – March 31
 Tire le coyote, Panorama
Al Tuck, Fair Country
Twin Flames, Jaaji and Chelsey June

V
Rosie Valland, Partir avant
Chad VanGaalen and Seth Smith, Seed of Dorzon – September 18
Jennie Vee, Spying – October 15
Viet Cong, Viet Cong – January 20
Vile Creature, A Steady Descent Into the Soil

W
The Wainwright Sisters (Martha Wainwright and Lucy Wainwright Roche), Songs in the Dark – November 13
Patrick Watson, Love Songs for Robots
The Weather Station, Loyalty – May 5
The Weeknd, Beauty Behind the Madness – August 28
The Wet Secrets, Tyranny of Objects
Whitehorse, Leave No Bridge Unburned – February 17
Hawksley Workman, Old Cheetah

Y
Yoan, Yoan – March 25
Yukon Blonde, On Blonde – June 16

Top hits on record
The lists are updated weekly through Nielsen Soundscan.

Albums

Singles

Canadian Hot 100 Year-End List

Deaths
June 8 – Archie Alleyne, 82, jazz drummer
November 19 – Ron Hynes, 64, singer-songwriter

References